Chandi is a small town in Nalanda, Bihar state, India.

The town's name is taken from the Hindu goddess Chandi Devi, to whom there is a dedicated temple in the town.

Chandi saw rapid development from 2005 to 2010.

Location
Chandi is a town in Chandi Tehsil of Nalanda District in the Indian state of Bihar and is located 17.3 km distance from the District's main city Bihar Sharif and 42 km from the state's main city Patna.

Villages in Chandi Tehsil are Gunjarchak, Gadanpura, Badhauna, Parari ,Korut, Tulsigarh, Dayalpur, Kurthia, Akair, Gonkura, Darveshpur, Yogiya, Gokhulpur, Dasturpar, Araut, Raitha, Jalalpur, Gaudhapar, Hasanchak, Hasni, Kurthiya, Madhopur, Mahkar, Sinduara, Bramasthan and Salehpur. Tulsigarh is one of the famous villages in Chandi tehsil, and is about 4 km from Chandi. 

Tarkeshwari Sinha, India's first female politician, came from Tulsigarh. She was elected to the 1st Lok Sabha from Patna East constituency in 1952. She was the first female Deputy Finance Minister in the union cabinet led by Prime Minister Jawaharlal Nehru from 1958 to 64.

Development
The town has one of the best roads in Bihar. Since 2010 Chandi has had water supplied by the government. It has a powerhouse that supplies electricity to a third of Nalanda, giving electricity for 21 hours daily, compared to an eight-hour supply four years previously. 

The village Akair has recently electrified with solar power and wind energy. 

The Government of Bihar established an engineering college Nalanda College of Engineering in Chandi in 2008.

 Badhauna 
 Lifeline Shishu Health care, with NICU facility

Economy

Chandi is a good place for farming crops such as lychee, ashoka, onion, potato and other vegetables, rice, wheat and mango. Satnag ,  Akair and Hanumangarh are famous for producing vegetables like Bhindi nenua brinjal karela and pumpkin. Nalanda has more than 100 cold stores.

The area has four bank branches, including Punjab National Bank, state Bank of India, Bank of India.

Pin code and neighbours
Chandi's pin code is 803108.

Other villages in 803108 are Brahmasthan, Korut, Yogiya, Badhauna, Madhopur, Rukhai and Tulsigarh.

Nearby villages are Badhauna (3 km), Yogiya (1.2 km), Vishunpur 3.5 km, Korut (2.0 km), Bhagwanpur (0.03 km), Gonkura (5.5), Darveshpur (6), Gokhulpur (1.5 km), Gaudhapar (4.5 km), Dasturpar (1.0 km), Madhopur (2.7 km), Tharthari (3.8 km), Hasni (4.3 km), Gangaura (4.7 km), Brahmasthan (5.5 km), Akair and (6.5 km). 
Towns near Chandi include Tharthari (3.8 km), Nagar Nausa (10.1 km), Harnaut (10.8 km), and Noorsarai (10.0 km).

Education
The government has established Nalanda College of Engineering with four undergraduate degrees: CE, CS, ME and EEE. The main degree colleges in Chandi are Magadh Mahavidyalya Chandi and Dr. Ram Raj Singh Mahila Vidyalya.

Schools include Bapu High School, Gyanodaya High School, Green Valley Public School, Brightland Central School, Primary Middle School, Gyandeep Public School, Shantikunj residential school, and St. Teresa English School.

References

Cities and towns in Nalanda district